The 1986 Richmond upon Thames Borough Council election took place on 8 May 1986 to elect members of Richmond upon Thames London Borough Council in London, England. The whole council was up for election and the SDP–Liberal Alliance gained overall control of the council.

Background

Election result

Ward results

References

1986
1986 London Borough council elections